Marcos Vinicius Borges Pancini (born December 5, 1979) is a Brazilian mixed martial artist who formerly competed in the bantamweight division of the Ultimate Fighting Championship. Vinicius was a competitor on The Ultimate Fighter: Brazil.

Mixed martial arts career

The Ultimate Fighter
In March 2012, it was revealed that Vinicius was selected to be a participant on The Ultimate Fighter: Brazil. He defeated Pedro Nobre via TKO in the first round to move into the Ultimate Fighter house, and become an official cast member.

Vina was selected as the fifth pick by Wanderlei Silva, to be a part of Team Wanderlei. In the first round of the tournament he was selected to fight Hugo Viana of Team Vitor. After two close rounds, Vina lost via unanimous decision.

After Team Vitor went 7–1, Dana White demanded the teams being scrambled in order to make it a fair contest. Vina was selected by Wanderlei to go to Team Vitor. Godofredo Pepey was selected to fight Strikeforce veteran Rodrigo Damm in the first semi-final fight. However, after the doctors removed Damm from the competition, and Vina stepped in to replace Damm and fight Castro. Vina lost the fight via second round submission.

Ultimate Fighting Championship
Vina made his UFC debut on June 23, 2012 at UFC 147 against Wagner Campos. He won the bout via TKO in the 3rd round, earning a Knockout of the Night bonus in the process.

Vinicius faced Johnny Bedford in a bantamweight bout on December 15, 2012 at The Ultimate Fighter: Team Carwin vs. Team Nelson Finale. He lost the fight via TKO in the second round.

Vinicius was expected to face Yuri Alcantara on May 18, 2013 at UFC on FX 8.  However, Vinicius  was forced out of the bout citing an injury.

Vinicius faced promotional newcomer Ali Bagautinov in a flyweight bout on September 4, 2013 at UFC Fight Night 28. After a back-and-forth first two rounds, Vinicius lost the fight via TKO in the third round, and was released from the promotion shortly after.

Post-UFC Career
Vinicius fought Taiyo Nakahara at Rebel Fighting Championship 1 on December 21, 2013. He lost by first-round TKO . Vinicius then faced Anderson Berlingeri at Talent MMA Circuit 6 on February 22, 2014. He lost the fight via first-round KO.

Championships and Accomplishments

Mixed martial arts
Ultimate Fighting Championship
Knockout of the Night (One time) vs. Wagner Campos

Mixed martial arts record

|-
|Win
|align=center|24–11–1
|Rafael Kobinski
|Submission (anaconda choke)
|Adventure Fighters Tournament: Explosion
|
|align=center|2
|align=center|2:41
|Curitiba, Paraná, Brazil
|
|-
|Loss
|align=center|23–11–1
|Rafael Correa
|Submission (calf slicer)
|Imortal FC 6
|
|align=center|1
|align=center|3:14
|Curitiba, Paraná, Brazil
|
|-
|Loss
|align=center|23–10–1
|Adlan Bataev
|TKO (punches)
|ACB 31: Magomedsharipov vs. Arapkhanov
|
|align=center|2
|align=center|4:25
|Grozny, Chechnya, Russia
|
|-
|Loss
|align=center|23–9–1
|Sidney Lessa de Oliveira
|Decision (unanimous)
|Frontline Fight Series: Vina vs. Junior Abedi
|
|align=center|3
|align=center|5:00
|São José dos Pinhais, Paraná, Brazil
|
|-
|Win
|align=center|23–8–1
|Eneas Gonçalves
|TKO (punches)
|Imortal FC 1
|
|align=center|1
|align=center|0:51
|Paraná, Brazil
|
|-
|Win
|align=center|22–8–1
|Luiz Antonio
|Submission (armbar)
|CTF 9: The Return
|
|align=center|2
|align=center|4:32
|Paraná, Brazil
|
|-
|Win
|align=center|21–8–1
|Jorge Yahari
|TKO (punches)
|Striker's House Cup 42
|
|align=center|2
|align=center|0:52
|Paraná, Brazil
|
|-
|Loss
|align=center|20–8–1
|Jae Hoon Moon
|TKO (kick to the body)
|Road FC: Road Fighting Championship 18
|
|align=center|1
|align=center|2:30
|Seoul, South Korea
|
|-
|Loss
|align=center|20–7–1
|Anderson Berlingeri
|KO (punch)
|Talent MMA Circuit 6
|
|align=center|1
|align=center|3:43
|Curitiba, Brazil
|
|-
|-
|Loss
|align=center|20–6–1
|Taiyo Nakahara
|TKO (punches)
|Rebel Fighting Championship 1
|
|align=center|1
|align=center|3:21
|Kallang, Singapore
|
|-
|Loss
|align=center|20–5–1
|Ali Bagautinov
|TKO (punches)
|UFC Fight Night: Teixeira vs. Bader
|
|align=center|3
|align=center|3:28
|Belo Horizonte, Brazil
|
|-
|Loss
|align=center|20–4–1
|Johnny Bedford
|KO (punches)
|The Ultimate Fighter 16 Finale
|
|align=center|2
|align=center|1:00
|Las Vegas, Nevada, United States
|
|-
|Win
|align=center|20–3–1
|Wagner Campos
|TKO (knees and punches)
|UFC 147
|
|align=center|3
|align=center|1:04
|Belo Horizonte, Brazil
|
|-
|Win
|align=center|19–3–1
|Francisco Cylderlan Lima da Silva
|TKO (punches)
|WFE 10
|
|align=center|2
|align=center|2:04
|Salvador, Brazil
|
|-
|Win
|align=center|18–3–1
|Rafael Mello
|TKO (punches)
|Brazilian Fight League 12
|
|align=center|3
|align=center|0:58
|Curitiba, Brazil
|
|-
|Win
|align=center|17–3–1
|Jose Borrome
|Submission (triangle choke)
|Octagono Espartano 3
|
|align=center|2
|align=center|2:55
|Pampatar, Venezuela
|
|-
|Loss
|align=center|16–3–1
|Fernando Duarte Guerra
|Decision (unanimous)
|Brave FC: Challenge
|
|align=center|3
|align=center|5:00
|Curitiba, Brazil
|
|-
|Win
|align=center|16–2–1
|Diego Santos
|Submission (rear naked choke)
|Power Fight Extreme 3
|
|align=center|1
|align=center|2:12
|Curitiba, Brazil
|
|-
|Win
|align=center|15–2–1
|Rafael Fagundes Machado
|Submission (rear naked choke)
|Samurai FC 3
|
|align=center|1
|align=center|2:34
|Curitiba, Brazil
|
|-
|Win
|align=center|14–2–1
|Andre Luis
|TKO (punches)
|Samurai FC 3
|
|align=center|1
|align=center|3:40
|Curitiba, Brazil
|
|-
|Win
|align=center|13–2–1
|Andre Luis
|Submission (guillotine choke)
|Power Fight Extreme 2
|
|align=center|1
|align=center|2:23
|Curitiba, Brazil
|
|-
|Win
|align=center|12–2–1
|Rafael Fagundes Machado
|Submission (armbar)
|Brazilian Fight League 5
|
|align=center|1
|align=center|N/A
|Curitiba, Brazil
|
|-
|Win
|align=center|11–2–1
|Edmilson Souza
|Submission (rear naked choke)
|Samurai FC 2
|
|align=center|1
|align=center|1:26
|Curitiba, Brazil
|
|-
|Draw
|align=center|10–2–1
|Rogelson Henrique Silveira
|Draw
|Torneio Estimulo
|
|align=center|3
|align=center|5:00
|Curitiba, Brazil
|
|-
|Loss
|align=center|10–2
|Erick Carlos Silva
|Decision (unanimous)
|Brazilian Fight League 4
|
|align=center|3
|align=center|5:00
|Curitiba, Brazil
|
|-
|Win
|align=center|10–1
|Diego Marlon
|Submission (rear naked choke)
|Brazilian Fight League 3
|
|align=center|1
|align=center|3:10
|São José dos Pinhais, Brazil
|
|-
|Win
|align=center|9–1
|Laerte Laio
|Submission (armbar)
|Samurai FC
|
|align=center|1
|align=center|1:44
|Curitiba, Brazil
|
|-
|Win
|align=center|8–1
|Diego Bataglia
|TKO (punches)
|Torneio Estimulo: First Round
|
|align=center|1
|align=center|2:54
|São Paulo, Brazil
|
|-
|Win
|align=center|7–1
|Kamikase Kamikase
|TKO (corner stoppage)
|Brazilian Fight League 1
|
|align=center|1
|align=center|5:00
|Curitiba, Brazil
|
|-
|Loss
|align=center|6–1
|Wagner Gavea
|KO (slam)
|Brave FC 1
|
|align=center|1
|align=center|2:25
|Curitiba, Brazil
|
|-
|Win
|align=center|6–0
|Diego Mercurio
|Submission (triangle choke)
|Fight Planet 2
|
|align=center|1
|align=center|1:48
|São Mateus do Sul, Brazil
|
|-
|Win
|align=center|5–0
|Jose Carlos Soares
|Submission (armbar)
|Champions Fight Grand Prix
|
|align=center|1
|align=center|N/A
|Curitiba, Brazil
|
|-
|Win
|align=center|4–0
|Marcos Oliveira
|Submission
|Champions Fight Grand Prix
|
|align=center|2
|align=center|N/A
|Curitiba, Brazil
|
|-
|Win
|align=center|3–0
|Alexandre Jacare
|Submission (armbar)
|Champions Fight Grand Prix
|
|align=center|2
|align=center|N/A
|Curitiba, Brazil
|
|-
|Win
|align=center|2–0
|Alexandre Jacare
|Submission (rear naked choke)
|Curitiba Top Fight 6
|
|align=center|1
|align=center|N/A
|Curitiba, Brazil
|
|-
|Win
|align=center|1–0
|Orestes Betran
|TKO (punches)
|Champions Fight
|
|align=center|1
|align=center|N/A
|Curitiba, Brazil
|

References

External links
 
 

Brazilian male mixed martial artists
Featherweight mixed martial artists
Living people
Sportspeople from Paraná (state)
1979 births
Ultimate Fighting Championship male fighters